John "Jock" Allan was a Scottish footballer, who played as a full back. Allan began his career in the Scottish League before moving to The Football League. After he was banned for life by the Football Association for match fixing, Allan moved to the United States and played for five seasons in the American Soccer League.

Great Britain
Allan began his professional career with Dunfermline Athletic. In 1910, he moved to Hibernian F.C. where he played two games in September. He then transferred to East Fife. On 10 May 1913, he transferred to Bury and remained with the team until 1923. On 1 May 1920, Bury tied at Coventry City, which allowed Coventry to remain in the Football League at the expense of Lincoln City. It eventually came to light that Coventry and Bury had conspired to fix the match. On 29 May 1923, after investigating the allegations, the Football Association Management Committee announced that Allan and several other players, managers and executives were banned for life. By then Allan had transferred to Reading, but was immediately released by the team.

United States
Following his suspension by the FA, Allan moved to the United States in 1924 where he signed with J&P Coats of the American Soccer League. He played only three games with Coats at the end of the 1923-1924 season, but became a fixture on the team's backline for the next three seasons. He saw time in only 13 games during the 1927-1928 season. He left the ASL in 1928.

References

American Soccer League (1921–1933) players
Bury F.C. players
Dunfermline Athletic F.C. players
East Fife F.C. players
Hibernian F.C. players
J&P Coats players
Reading F.C. players
Scottish footballers
Year of death missing
People from Cardenden
Footballers from Fife
Scottish Football League players
Scottish expatriate footballers
Expatriate soccer players in the United States
Year of birth missing
Association football fullbacks
Scottish expatriate sportspeople in the United States